BQR may refer to:

 By Queroseno Racing, a racing team
 Burusu language (by ISO 639-3 language code)
 Buffalo-Lancaster Regional Airport (by FAA location identifier)